Berta Vicente Salas is a Spanish photographer. She was born in Barcelona, Spain on 22 March 1994.

Work 
By  2013, at the age of 19, she was the finalist in the Sony World Photography Awards for her photograph Ariadna in Urquinaona from her series Urquinaona. It was shot in an abandoned building in Spain, which she described:  'This is a building that was going to be demolished to have a hotel built. Luckily, I found it before the demolition, and its caretaker allowed me to explore the amazing place. It was probably some of the most magical places I’ve ever been. It's located in the Barcelona city center, and is now a hotel.'
Vicente Salas began a project in Australia along with the photographer Ibai Acevedo named Antipodes. She started to study visual research in the Open University of Catalonia .

In 2016 her series of work about the women penitentiary was released. Vicente Salas traveled to Mexico to teach photography in the prison of Juarez, Mexico as a social program and began her series Centro Penitenciario de Menores, Ciudad De Juárez México.

In an interview for IT Fashion online magazine,  Vicente Salas explained the process of her work:
I have the feeling of always being rehearsing. I practice and then I start creating. I want to experiment and then be sure of what I am doing. What I do, I do it guiding myself through my interests of the moment, and I am drawn to people. I love them. They are fascinating. I love how you can create a time of making a picture and understand what the person you are photographing is giving to you.’

Awards 
2014: FLICKR 20 under 20: Selected photographer 2014: Project GrisArt Scholarship

2013: Fototalentos Banco Santander Foundation: First prize 2013: Sony World Photography Awards: First position for portrait category.

2012: Sony World Photography Awards: Finalist in the category of portraits for the convocation of YOUTH.

2011: Emergent Festival of Lleida: selected artist.

Exhibitions 
2015: TEDxyouth BCN: Sala Ciutat, Barcelona City Hall

2014: FLICKR 20 under 20 en Milk Studios, New York

2014: PALMAPHOTO 2014 Xavier Fiol Gallery, Palma de Mallorca, España

2014:  REVELA-T festival in Can Manyer Library, Vilassar de Dalt-Barcelona

2014: Barcelona Negra, Valid Foto Gallery, Barcelona

2014: O.F.N.I in Valid Foto Gallery, Barcelona

2013: Sony World Photography Awards 2013, Somerset House (Arts and Cultural Centre) London 2013: Colecciona el mundo in Valid Foto Gallery, Barcelona

2013: Realidad y emoción in Valid Foto Gallery, Barcelona

2012: Sony World Photography Awards 2012, Somerset House (Arts and Cultural Centre) London 2012: Emergent Lleida 2011, Valid Foto Gallery, Barcelona

References 

BERTA  VICENTE SALAS // ENTREVISTA. (2013, February 15). Retrieved April  2017, from No dsparen al artista:  https://nodisparenalartista.wordpress.com/2013/02/15/entrevista-a-berta-vicente-salas/

Carolin. (2015, June 9). Berta Vicente Salas.  Retrieved April 2017, from Art fucks me: http://artfucksme.com/berta-vicente-salas/

Domínguez Lavín, A. (2013, March 19). Berta Vicente  ganadora en la categoría de retratos en los Sony World Photography Awards  2013. Retrieved April 2017, from Xakata Foto:  https://www.xatakafoto.com/concursos/berta-vicente-ganadora-en-la-categoria-de-retratos-en-los-sony-world-photography-awards-2013

Gil, L. (2014, July 21). BERTA VICENTE, LA FOTÓGRAFA QUE  NACIÓ DE LA SUPERACIÓN. Retrieved April 2017, from It Fashion:  http://www.itfashion.com/cultura/fotografia/berta-vicente-la-fotografa-que-nacio-de-la-superacion/

Grove, A. (2013, March 25). Berta Vicente (18 años y  finalista del World Photography): "Las fotos marcan el ritmo de mi  vida". Retrieved April 2017, from 20 minutos:  http://www.20minutos.es/noticia/1768401/0/berta-vicente/finalista-premio/sony-world-photography/

Katerina. (2014, November 14). 20under20 Spotlight:  Berta Vicente. Retrieved April 2017, from Flickr blog: http://blog.flickr.net/en/2014/11/19/20under20-spotlight-berta-vicente/

Pilar. (2011, December 4). Berta Vicente Salas.  Retrieved 2017 April, from El dado del arte :  http://eldadodelarte.blogspot.com/2011/12/berta-vicente-salas.html

Vicente Salas, B. (n.d.). Fotografía artística analógica  y digital. Retrieved April 2017, from Domestika:  https://www.domestika.org/en/courses/84-fotografia-artistica-analogica-y-digital

External links
Sony Word Photography Awards
IT Fashion online magazine
Berta Vicente Salas

Spanish photographers
1994 births
Living people